Gero Kretschmer and Alexander Satschko were the defending champions but chose not to defend their title.

Ariel Behar and Enrique López Pérez won the title after defeating Facundo Bagnis and Fabrício Neis 6–2, 6–4 in the final.

Seeds

Draw

External Links
 Main Draw

Internazionali di Tennis Città di Vicenza - Doubles
2018 Doubles